Breux may refer to several communes in France:

Breux, Meuse, in the Meuse département 
Breux-Jouy, in the Essonne département 
Breux-sur-Avre, in the Eure département

See also
 Noël Breux (1773–1861), politician in Lower Canada